Sebastian Otoa (born 10 October 2004) is a Danish professional footballer who plays as a centre-back for the U-19 squad of Danish Superliga club AaB.

Career

AaB
Otoa joined AaB in the summer 2021, after turning down a contract offer at FC Roskilde, where he played U19 before joining AaB. Before that, he had spent three years in F.C. Copenhagen's academy. But his adventure in AaB got off to a rough start, as the tall defender only managed to play one game for AaB's U19 team before a series of leg strain injuries set in. In the spring of 2022, he returned to action for the U19 team, and also played a few reserve team matches.

After several sales in the AaB-squad, Otoa was called up for his first Danish Superliga match on 11 September 2022 against Lyngby Boldklub. 29 minutes into the match, Lars Kramer was injured and Otoa came on for his professional debut.

References

External links

2004 births
Living people
Danish men's footballers
Association football defenders
Danish Superliga players
F.C. Copenhagen players
FC Roskilde players
AaB Fodbold players